
Gmina Zaręby Kościelne is a rural gmina (administrative district) in Ostrów Mazowiecka County, Masovian Voivodeship, in east-central Poland.

Villages
Gmina Zaręby Kościelne contains the villages and settlements of Budziszewo, Chmielewo, Gaczkowo, Gąsiorowo, Grabowo, Kańkowo-Piecki, Kępiste-Borowe, Kietlanka, Kosuty, Niemiry, Nienałty-Brewki, Nienałty-Szymany, Nowa Złotoria, Pętkowo Wielkie, Pułazie, Rawy-Gaczkowo, Rostki-Daćbogi, Skłody Średnie, Skłody-Piotrowice, Skłody-Stachy, Stara Złotoria, Świerże Zielone, Świerże-Kiełcze, Świerże-Kończany, Świerże-Panki, Uścianek Wielki, Zakrzewo Wielkie, Zakrzewo-Kopijki, Zaręby Kościelne, Zaręby Leśne, Zgleczewo Panieńskie and Zgleczewo Szlacheckie.

Neighbouring gminas
Gmina Zaręby Kościelne is bordered by the gminas of Andrzejewo, Ceranów, Małkinia Górna, Nur, Ostrów Mazowiecka and Szulborze Wielkie.

References

Polish official population figures 2006

Zareby Koscielne
Ostrów Mazowiecka County